Andrey Yuriyevich Demanov (born 15 July 1985) is a Russian weightlifter. He competed for Russia at the 2012 Summer Olympics, originally finishing fourth in the men's middleheavyweight category (-94 kg).

On 21 November 2016 the IOC disqualified him from the 2012 Olympic Games and struck his results from the record for failing a drugs test in a re-analysis of his doping sample from 2012.

References

Russian male weightlifters
Weightlifters at the 2012 Summer Olympics
Olympic weightlifters of Russia
1985 births
Living people
Doping cases in weightlifting
Russian sportspeople in doping cases
Universiade medalists in weightlifting
Universiade gold medalists for Russia
Universiade silver medalists for Russia
European Weightlifting Championships medalists
Medalists at the 2011 Summer Universiade
Medalists at the 2013 Summer Universiade
20th-century Russian people
21st-century Russian people